Supro is an American brand, currently owned by Bond Audio, a manufacturer of effects units. Formerly, Supro produced musical instruments as a subsidiary of Valco. The brand entered into disuse after the closure of Valco in 1968, being later revived in 2013.

Range of products currently commercialised under the Supro name includes electric guitars, basses, amplifiers and effects units.

History 
Supro was basically the budget brand of companies such as National (then merged with Dobro to form "National Dobro") and later, Valco, which would take over those brands. Valco was notorious for manufacturing its guitars with components (especially bodies) provided by other manufacturers.

Supro was also a premium brand of amplifiers, being also the first to produce a combo amp with reverb. Supro amps built from the 1930s to the 1950s were regarded for their sound for rock records.

The brand was revived in 2013, having reintroduced a line of vintage guitars and amplifiers since then.

Rights to the Supro name were acquired by Absara Audio, parent company of effects units manufacturer Pigtronix. The rights to Brand were bought from its previous owner, Bruce Zinky. Zinky had owned the brand during many years, designing amplifiers for Fender.

To help its expansion, Absara built a new production facility in Port Jefferson Station, New York, starting with a vintage line of US-made Supro tube amps. Zinky was retained by Absara as design engineer, collaborating with the company on the modern designs of Supro amps.

In 2017, Supro entered into an exclusive distribution agreement with Jam Industries to market the brand in North America. Managed by Joe Delaney, the brand experienced massive growth in sales and notoriety with major product launches such as the Black Magick series, pedals and guitars.

In 2020, Supro was purchased by Bond Audio.

Gallery

See also 
 Valco

References

External links 

 Official website

Guitar manufacturing companies of the United States
Guitar amplifier manufacturers
Audio equipment manufacturers of the United States
Musical instruments brands